Larry Ragland's 4x4 Challenge is a racing game developed by Spanish studio Xpiral and published by Xicat Interactive, and endorsed by the eponymous American off-road racing driver, Larry Ragland.

Gameplay

Development

Reception

Larry Ragland's 4x4 Challenge received mixed reception by critics.

References

Exterlink links
 

2001 video games
Off-road racing video games
Video games based on real people
Video games developed in Spain
Windows games
Windows-only games
Xicat Interactive games
Multiplayer and single-player video games